This is a list of places in Belarus. At the higher administrative level, Belarus is divided into 6 voblasts (usually translated as regions or provinces) and one municipality (horad, i.e., "city"); the latter one is a special status of the capital of Belarus. 
Minsk, the horad
Brest Province (Brest)
Homyel Province (Homyel')
Hrodna Province (Hrodna)
Mahilyow Province (Mahilyow)
Minsk Province (Minsk)
Vitsebsk Province (Vitsebsk)
List of cities in Belarus

External links
 Belarus Places and Cities Information for Tourists
 Current Status of United Nations Romanization Systems for Geographical Names of Belarus

Geography of Belarus
Places
Lists of places by country